João António Silva Duarte Galo (born 23 October 1961) is a former Portuguese footballer who played as central defender.

Galo gained 1 cap for the Portugal national team.

External links 
 
 

1961 births
Living people
Sportspeople from Almada
C.F. Os Belenenses players
Portugal international footballers
Portuguese footballers
Primeira Liga players
Association football defenders
Atlético Clube de Portugal players